Gulpilhares is a former civil parish in the municipality of Vila Nova de Gaia, Portugal. In 2013, the parish merged into the new parish Gulpilhares e Valadares. The population in 2011 was 11,341, in an area of 5.47 km². It includes Miramar, Francelos and other beaches.

References

Former parishes of Vila Nova de Gaia